Jaime Eduardo Duarte Huerta (born 27 February 1955) is a Peruvian football former professional player and manager. He played as a right-back.

Club career
At a club level, Duarte played his football for Alianza Lima in Peru where he was a member of the team that won two consecutive Peruvian league titles in 1977 and 1978.

Duarte also played for Sport Boys, San Agustín in Peru and Deportivo Italia in Venezuela.

International career
Duarte played a total of 55 games for the Peru national team between 1975 and 1985 including appearances at the World Cup in 1978 and 1982 and the Copa América in 1979 and 1983.

Managerial career
Duarte managed the Peru women's national team at the 2010 South American Championship.

References

1955 births
Living people
Footballers from Lima
Peruvian footballers
Association football fullbacks
Club Alianza Lima footballers
Deportivo Italia players
Sport Boys footballers
Peruvian Primera División players
Peru international footballers
1978 FIFA World Cup players
1982 FIFA World Cup players
Peruvian expatriate footballers
Peruvian expatriate sportspeople in Venezuela
Expatriate footballers in Venezuela
Peruvian football managers
Women's association football managers
Peru women's national football team managers